Suzanne Grandais (June 14, 1893 – August 28, 1920) was a French film actress popular during the World War I years. She was called "The Mary Pickford of France" because of her resemblance to the American superstar Mary Pickford. She was also compared to American serial queen Pearl White. She worked often with directors Léonce Perret and Louis Feuillade. Grandais was killed in a car crash in August 1920 while shooting scenes for a serial.

Partial filmography
Olga, the Adventuress (1912) short
The Ransom of Happiness (1912) short
The Mystery of the Kador Cliffs (1912)
Le Noel de Francesca (1912) short
A Lesson in Love (1912) short
Un nuage (1912) short
Le pont sur l'abime (1912)
La fin d'une revolution americaine (1912)
Les audaces de coeur (1913) short
Leonce en voyage de noces (1913) short
La dentelliere (1913) short
L'Apollon des roches noires (1913) short
Tragic Error (1913) short
Suzanne et les brigands (1920)
Gosse de riche (1920)
L'essor (1921)

Sources
Some info from article on Suzanne Grandais from French Wikipedia.

External links

short clip from "Error Tragique"(1913)
Suzanne Grandais; photo(Flickr)

1893 births
1920 deaths
French film actresses
20th-century French actresses
Actresses from Paris